is the persona of several Japanese professional wrestlers. The persona was inspired by the title character in Ikki Kajiwara's and Naoki Tsuji's 1968 manga series, Tiger Mask about a professional wrestler who was a feared heel in the United States, but became a face after returning to Japan when a young boy said that he wanted to be a villain like Tiger Mask when he grew up. As of October 2018, eight professional wrestlers have used the Tiger Mask persona during their careers.

History

In the early 1980s, the bookers in the New Japan Pro-Wrestling promotion licensed the character and created a real-life Tiger Mask, originally portrayed by Satoru Sayama, to help boost their junior heavyweight division. In the United States, Tiger Mask was the first wrestler to simultaneously hold the WWF Junior Heavyweight Championship and NWA World Junior Heavyweight Championship. Sayama played the role until 1983, when he left New Japan due to his hatred for the backstage politics of professional wrestling in general. As Tiger Mask, Sayama feuded with Kuniaki Kobayashi, Canada's Bret Hart, England's Chris Adams, Steve Wright and legendary Dynamite Kid, Mexico's Fishman and the original Black Tiger (see below).

In 1984, the rights to the Tiger Mask gimmick were bought by All Japan Pro Wrestling and given to Mitsuharu Misawa. Misawa also feuded with Dynamite Kid and Kuniaki Kobayashi, as well as Chavo Guerrero, Sr. and Atsushi Onita; he then moved up to the heavyweight division to feud, albeit unsuccessfully, with Jumbo Tsuruta and Genichiro Tenryu. In May 1990, after Tenryu left All Japan, Misawa gave up the mask in the middle of a match to wrestle as himself.

New Japan's Koji Kanemoto became the third Tiger Mask in March 1992 but was unsuccessful due to the dominance of Jyushin Thunder Liger. Kanemoto was never able to win a title as Tiger Mask and eventually lost the mask in a mask-vs-mask match against Liger in January 1994.

Since 1995, the name Tiger Mask has been held by Yoshihiro Yamazaki, who was trained directly (and is officially endorsed) by Sayama. Tiger Mask IV, originally based at Michinoku Pro Wrestling, entered New Japan in 2002.

A fifth-generation Tiger Mask, MMA fighter Ikuhisa Minowa, debuted on July 18, 2010, alongside the original Tiger Mask, Sayama, in a tag match for Maki Dojo.

In conjunction with the launch of the Tiger Mask W anime series, NJPW debuted Tiger Mask W on October 10, 2016, at King of Pro-Wrestling. This character was portrayed by Kota Ibushi and teamed with Tiger Mask IV in a match against Kazuchika Okada and Gedo.

In October 2018, Satoru Sayama announced the debut of Shinsetsu Tiger Mask, a student of his with Shinsetsu meaning "true teachings" in Japanese.

Related characters
The evil twin character Black Tiger (using a black costume with silver stripes) was created by New Japan in 1981 to oppose Sayama, and portrayed by Mark Rocco, though he did not exclusively feud with Tiger Mask. As Black Tiger, Rocco also feuded with The Cobra (George Takano), and the second incarnation Eddie Guerrero also feuded with Jyushin Thunder Liger and Wild Pegasus. For many years, Black Tiger was only portrayed by foreign wrestlers, but the tradition was broken in 2009, when Tatsuhito Takaiwa was unmasked as Black Tiger. Tomohiro Ishii also had a short-lived run as the sixth incarnation in 2010.

When Tiger Mask IV was in Michinoku Pro Wrestling, he was briefly opposed by Masked Tiger, a doppelgänger character portrayed by Battlarts wrestler Takeshi Ono.

Último Dragón, as a temporary break between gigs in the World Wrestling Entertainment (WWE), adopted the name and character The Tiger, modeled after the original, "The Tiger" Satoru Sayama, who was his childhood idol. Último also made a character called Tiger Dragon which saw his attire a blend of the Último Dragón and Tiger Mask garb. Sayama himself used the Super Tiger (in the original UWF) and uses the Tiger King and Original Tiger Mask characters in special appearances since 1996, as a means to differentiate himself as being the original.

Real Japan Pro Wrestling, a promotion founded by Sayama, has a wrestler named Super Tiger II, who has an opponent named Tiger Shark. Both of them are Sayama trainees.

Sayama also gave brief authorization for a female version of the character, called Tiger Dream, to be played by female wrestler Candy Okutsu in the mid-1990s. He and Tiger Mask IV also provided her with training. Another female gimmick, this one named Tiger Queen, debuted in Strong Style Pro-Wrestling in 2021, with wrestler Asuka under the mask.

Osaka Pro has a wrestler named Tigers Mask who wears a mask similar to Tiger Mask and is portrayed as a fan of the Hanshin Tigers baseball team. He even had an opponent named Black Tigers, a character based in Black Tiger and played by Jeremy Lopez.

Former Frontier Martial-Arts Wrestling superstar Ricky Fuji developed a Tiger Mask persona of his own called Calgary Tiger, influenced by the Canadian city, where he was trained, and debuted as a wrestler. He had debuted under the Tiger Mask persona in Stampede Wrestling, before changing his persona to Black Tomcat, while in the North Western Wrestling Federation in Canada.

American pro wrestler Treach Phillips Jr. wrestled as Tiger Mask V in the early 2000s, but is not recognized as an official incarnation of the character. Ken Peale and Tommy Gilbert have also wrestled under the name "Tiger Mask" at certain points in their careers.

In 1971, Samson Kutsuwada portrayed Tiger Mask on one Japan Pro Wrestling Alliance tour of South Korea.

Signature moves associated with the character
Tiger suplex
Double underhook transitioned maneuvers
Space Flying Tiger Drop (Cartwheel suicide corkscrew crossbody)

Championships and accomplishments
 Pro Wrestling Illustrated (PWI) ranked Mitsuharu Misawa's version of Tiger Mask No. 37 of the 500 best singles wrestlers during the PWI Years in 2003.

References

External links
Tiger Mask Wrestler Info
A history of the Tiger Mask gimmick, with all the profiles of the Tiger Mask wrestlers, plus related and unrelated characters (In Japanese)

Professional wrestling gimmicks